Samsung SGH-T401G is a side slider messaging featurephone manufactured by Samsung for use on the U.S. GSM networks of Net10, TracFone Wireless, and Straight Talk.

Hardware and features

The front of the phone has a traditional 23-key keypad consisting of twelve input keys and eleven function keys, of which one is dedicated for one-touch text messaging. The full 38-key QWERTY keyboard slides out to the left (pictured).

The back houses a 1.3 Mpix camera and video recorder. The device also includes support for Bluetooth, Stereo and a MicroSD card slot for music storage.

Software features include text and picture messaging, a web browser, and an MP3 player.

References

External links
Official product page for SGH-T401G
GSM Arena page for Samsung T401g

Samsung mobile phones
Mobile phones introduced in 2009